was a Japanese pop girl group under the Being label in Being Inc. agency.

Biography
In 2013, Being Inc. held an audition search for new talent, and six girls were chosen to form a new pop group. Each girls has colors which represents themselves. Origin of the unit name comes from "The Power Of Music (Power of Music) as the Pride Of New generation. In 2015 they made a major debut with a single Bump!!. In February 2018 staff announced through website disband and after final live on March they've had officially disbanded.

They've released 6 singles and one best album.

Discography

Singles

Compilation album

References

External links
Official website 
Official Twitter 
Official Blog 

Being Inc. artists
Anime musicians
Japanese dance music groups
Japanese dance musicians
Japanese pop music groups
Japanese electropop groups
Japanese girl groups
Japanese idol groups
Musical groups established in 2013
Musical groups disestablished in 2018
2013 establishments in Japan